Amblyseius adhatodae is a species of mite in the family Phytoseiidae.

References

adhatodae
Articles created by Qbugbot
Animals described in 1967